The RIT Tigers represented the Rochester Institute of Technology in College Hockey America during the 2018-19 NCAA Division I women's ice hockey season.

Offseason

Chad Davis was named Head Coach on August 22.

Recruiting

Standings

2018–19 Tigers

2018–19 Schedule

|-
!colspan=12 style=| Regular Season

|-
!colspan=12 style=| CHA Tournament

Awards and honors

References

RIT
RIT Tigers women's ice hockey seasons
Sports in Rochester, New York